Jessica "Jessye" Lapenn is an American career member of the Senior Foreign Service, class of Minister-Counselor, who was sworn in as the U.S. Ambassador to the African Union and the U.S. Permanent Representative to the United Nations Economic Commission for Africa on August 27, 2019.  Immediately prior, Lapenn served as the Chargé d'Affaires at U.S. Mission in South Africa from 2016 to 2019.

Born and raised in New York City, Lapenn earned a BA in Women's Studies from Harvard College and an MPhil in International Development from Cambridge University.

References

Year of birth missing (living people)
Living people
People from New York City
Harvard College alumni
Alumni of the University of Cambridge
United States Foreign Service personnel
American women ambassadors
Ambassadors of the United States
Ambassadors of the United States to South Africa
Representatives of the United States to the African Union
United Nations specialized agencies people
21st-century American diplomats
21st-century American women